Greenhorn on the Frontier is an historical, young-adult novel by the American writer Ann Finlayson.

It is set in 1770s Pittsburgh, Pennsylvania, just before the American Revolutionary War, and tells the story of nineteen-year-old Harry Warrilow and his twenty-three-year-old sister, Sukey, who move their few possessions by hand cart to start their own farm on the Western Pennsylvania frontier. The plot features characters like Simon Girty, Arthur St. Clair, and Indian tribes such as the Shawnee and Lenape.

References

1974 American novels
Novels set in Pennsylvania
Novels set in the 1770s
Frederick Warne & Co books